Titilope Sonuga, also known as Titi Sonuga, is a Nigerian poet, civil engineer, and actress who spends her time between Lagos and Edmonton, Canada.

Early years
Titilope Sonuga, who was born in Lagos, Nigeria, relocated to Edmonton, Canada, when she was 13 years old. Sonuga spent five years working as an engineer while pursuing her interests in poetry and performing in her free time.

Poetry
Sonuga won the 2011 Canadian Authors Association Emerging Writer Award and the 2012 Maya Angelou Poetry Contest. She established Rouge Poetry in Edmonton, a poetry slam series. In May 2015 she became the first poet to appear at a Nigerian presidential inauguration. She published a poetry collection in 2016. Sonuga has performed in the Lagos International Poetry Festival. she was named Edmonton's ninth poet laureate.

Other works
Aside from poetry, Sonuga has dabbled in acting and portrays Eki in the second series of NdaniTV's hit series Gidi Up with OC Ukeje, Deyemi Okanlawon, Somkele Iyamah, and Ikechukwu Onunaku. She also works as Intel’s ambassador for the She Will Connect Program across Nigeria. She wrote the critically acclaimed musical "Ada the Country" which was staged at the Agip Recital Hall of MUSON Center from Jan 2, 2020.

Personal life
In 2015 she announced her engagement to photographer Seun Williams. She has since become a mother.

See also
 List of Nigerian actors

References

External links

Nigerian women poets
Living people
Yoruba actresses
Yoruba poets
English-language writers from Nigeria
Nigerian expatriates in Canada
21st-century Nigerian actresses
21st-century Nigerian poets
21st-century Nigerian women writers
Nigerian poets
Nigerian film actresses
Nigerian civil engineers
1985 births
Poets Laureate of places in Canada